Dawud may refer to:
 David in Islam
 Dawud (name)
 Dawud of Kanem, half-brother of the 14th-century Kanem emperor Idris I of Kanem
 An-Nasir Dawud, Kurdish ruler
 Askia Dawud,  ruler of the Songhai Empire
 Mohammad Al-Dawud, Jordanian football player

See also 
 Daoud (disambiguation)
 Daud (disambiguation)
 Dawood (disambiguation)
 Dawoud
 David (name)